Simon Fraser (born March 27, 1983 in Champaign, Illinois) is a former American football defensive end. He was signed by the Cleveland Browns as an undrafted free agent in 2005. He played college football at Ohio State.

Fraser has also played for the Atlanta Falcons.

Fraser graduated from the Ohio University Heritage College of Osteopathic Medicine in 2015. Fraser is now a surgical resident in Columbus, Ohio.

College career
At the Ohio State University, Fraser was a three-time OSU Scholar-Athlete selection and a two-time Academic All-Big Ten Conference honoree, as well as a co-captain as a senior.

He was a member of the 2002 Ohio State Buckeyes football team that won the 2003 BCS National Championship Game by defeating the University of Miami Hurricanes in a double overtime game at the 2003 Fiesta Bowl.

Inspired by the doctors and nurses at Wexner Medical Center and Nationwide Children's Hospital who helped save the lives of his son and daughter (premature twins), he went to medical school at Heritage College of Osteopathic Medicine to pursue a career in medicine. http://www.dispatch.com/content/stories/sports/2011/06/12/a-healers-calling.html

Professional career

Cleveland Browns
Fraser played in Cleveland for three seasons (2005–2007).

Atlanta Falcons
On March 7, 2008, he signed with the Atlanta Falcons and was waived by the team on April 28, 2009.

References

1983 births
Living people
People from Champaign, Illinois
American football defensive tackles
American football defensive ends
Ohio State Buckeyes football players
Cleveland Browns players
Atlanta Falcons players
Players of American football from Columbus, Ohio